Norfolk Jet Express Pty Ltd was an airline based on Norfolk Island offering scheduled, international, domestic, passenger and cargo services. It ceased operations in June 2005 due to financial difficulties.

History
Norfolk Jet Express was established in May 1997 by Norfolk Island resident and businessman Gregg Prechelt. It started operations in the same month and ceased on 07 Jun 2005 after voluntary liquidation.

Services
Norfolk Jet Express provided services from Norfolk Island to Brisbane and Sydney using the Air Nauru Boeing 737-400 and Alliance Airlines Fokker 100 aircraft to Auckland at one stage.

Fleet
The aircraft fleet firstly consisted of just one single BAe 146-100 then progressed to a Fokker 100 (wet leased from Alliance Airlines) and a Boeing 737-400 (leased from Air Nauru)

See also
 List of defunct airlines of Australia
 Aviation in Australia

References

Airlines established in 1997
Defunct airlines of Norfolk Island
Airlines disestablished in 2005